Achim Stadler (27 August 1961 – 6 July 2022) was a German cyclist. He competed in the individual road race event at the 1984 Summer Olympics.

References

External links
 

1961 births
2022 deaths
People from Speyer
German male cyclists
Olympic cyclists of West Germany
Cyclists at the 1984 Summer Olympics
Cyclists from Rhineland-Palatinate